Elkington is a surname. Notable people with the surname include:

Audrey Elkington (born 1957), English priest, Archdeacon of Bodmin
George Elkington (1801–1865), English businessman and electroplating pioneer
Henry Elkington (1890–1963), Australian rules footballer
Jodi Elkington (born 1993), Australian sprinter
John Elkington (business author) (born 1949), English businessman and author
John Elkington (British Army officer) (1830–1889), British Army general, Lieutenant Governor of Guernsey
John Simeon Colebrook Elkington (1871–1955), Australian public health advocate
Joseph Elkington (1740–1806), English agriculturalist
Lilian Elkington (1900–1969), English pianist and composer
Steve Elkington (born 1962), Australian golfer
Tim Elkington (1920–2019), English Royal Air Force officer